Marina Grande may refer to:
 Marina Grande, Capri
 Marina Grande, Scilla
 Marina Grande, Sorrento

See also
 Marinha Grande, municipality in Leiria, Portugal